The Catholic literary revival is a term that has been applied to a movement towards explicitly Catholic allegiance and themes among leading literary figures in France and England, roughly in the century from 1860 to 1960. This often involved conversion to Catholicism or a conversion-like return to the Catholic Church. The phenomenon is sometimes extended to the United States.

France
French authors sometimes grouped in a Catholic literary revival include Léon Bloy, J. K. Huysmans, Charles Péguy, Paul Claudel, Georges Bernanos and François Mauriac, as well as the philosophers Jacques Maritain and Gabriel Marcel.

England
The main figures who have been seen as constituting a revival of a leading Catholic presence in national literary life in England include John Henry Newman, Gerard Manley Hopkins, Hilaire Belloc, G. K. Chesterton, Alfred Noyes, Robert Hugh Benson, Ronald Knox, Graham Greene, and Evelyn Waugh. Of these, Belloc was the only writer raised a Catholic; the others were adult converts.

J.R.R. Tolkien, although a convinced Catholic, "is not generally perceived to be one of the key protagonists of the Catholic literary revival". In his writing, his own Catholic convictions and his use of Catholic themes are far less explicit than was the case for the other writers mentioned. There is, however, a growing tendency to look at Tolkien within the English Catholic literary tradition of his time.

Although distinct, a movement towards explicit religious loyalty and themes in Anglican and Anglo-Catholic writers such as George MacDonald, T. S. Eliot, C. S. Lewis and Dorothy L. Sayers is sometimes linked to the Catholic literary revival as a broader phenomenon.

United States
Due to the influence of Catholic literature from England in the United States, the concept of "Catholic revival" is sometimes extended to include American authors such as Dorothy Day, Thomas Merton, William Thomas Walsh, Warren Carroll, Fulton Sheen, Walker Percy, J. F. Powers and Flannery O'Connor. One of the early leaders of the revival in the United States was the editor and publisher Francis X. Talbot.

The Catholic Poetry Society was founded in 1931 to further a tradition of Catholic poetry. They published Spirit: A Magazine of Poetry.

References

Citations 

Literary movements
19th-century literature
20th-century British literature
20th-century French literature
20th-century American literature
Catholic culture